Tarannum Riyaz (9 August 1960 – 20 May 2021) was an Indian writer and a senior fellow with the Ministry of Culture, Government of India.

Biography
Students in several universities in India have done their M.Phil. and Ph.D. research on the works of Tarannum Riyaz. She has been lecturing in institutions of art and literature in India and abroad. Her books are on the curriculum in different levels of educational institutions in India.

Death 
Riyaz died from COVID-19 in 2021, a month after her husband's death  Riyaz Punjabi.

Published works 
"Zer e Sabza Mehw e Khwaab" (poetry – 2015)
"Ajnabee Jazeeron Men" (essays – 2015)
"Bhadon K Chaand Taley" (poetry – 2015)
Barf Aashna Parindey (novel – 2009, second edition 2010; Hindi edition 2013)
Meraa Rakhte Safar (short stories – 2008)
Fareb E Khitta E Gul (4 novellas – 2008)
Purani Kitaabon Ki Khusbhu (poetry – 2005)
Chashme Naqshe Kadam (critical essay – 2005)
Beeswi Sadi Mein Khawateen Ka Urdu Adab (anthology – 2005)
Moorti (novel – 2002)
Yimberzal (short stories – 2002)
Abbabeelain Laut Aaengi (short stories – 2000)
Yeh Tang Zameen (short stories – 1998)

References 

1960 births
2021 deaths
People from Srinagar
Urdu-language fiction writers
Urdu critics
Urdu-language novelists
University of Kashmir alumni
Deaths from the COVID-19 pandemic in India
Urdu-language poets from India
20th-century Indian women writers
20th-century Indian writers
21st-century Indian women writers
21st-century Indian writers
Indian women poets
Indian women novelists